Bollonaster is a monotypic genus of echinoderms belonging to the family Astropectinidae. The only species is Bollonaster pectinatus.

The species is found in Australia.

References

Astropectinidae